This is a list of 159 species in the genus Lepidosaphes.

Lepidosaphes species

References

Lepidosaphes